At least two separatist pro-Russian militias during the Russo-Ukrainian War adopted the name Odessa Brigade. The older unit, officially the Separate Brigade of Special Purpose "Odessa" or OBRON "Odessa", originated as a militant anti-Maidan group which emerged in the Ukrainian city of Odesa in 2014. It emerged within the pro-Russian "Odesskaya Druzhina" movement which was involved in the 2014 Odesa clashes. Following this event, members of "Odesskaya Druzhina" (and others from Odesa and Russia) reorganized themselves into a separatist militia in the Donbas, fighting on behalf of the Luhansk People's Republic in the war in Donbas. This first unit was disbanded in January 2015, probably as a result of inter-separatist power struggles.

Following the 2022 Russian invasion of Ukraine, another pro-Russian "Odessa Brigade" was claimed to have been founded in the context of the Southern Ukraine campaign.

History

First unit 

The important port city of Odesa (also spelled "Odessa") in Ukraine was one of the locations where pro-Euromaidan and anti-Maidan groups clashed during the Revolution of Dignity of 2014 and the following period of pro-Russian unrest. Radical pro-Russian demonstrators in Odesa mobilized into a militant movement, referred to as "Odesskaya Druzhina". There were other militant groups besides "Odesskaya Druzhina" such as the similarly named "People's Druzhina of Odessa"; the militants generally shared extremist right- or left-wing viewpoints, with "Odesskaya Druzhina" being identified by openDemocracy as being antisemite.

Russian ultranationalist and Black Hundreds member Anton Rayevsky used the opportunity to travel to Ukraine. On 19 March, he arrived at Odesa, set up base at the pro-Russian tent camp outside the city, and began to recruit "Odesskaya Druzhina" members into an even more radical militant group. He dubbed his force the "Odessa Brigade", and trained its fighters in close combat. Posing as a local, Rayevsky and his followers subsequently took part in pro-Russian demonstrations in the city, clashing with Ukrainian unionists and security forces. At one point, Rayevsky proposed that he should murder the local pro-Ukrainian Right Sector leader. The leadership of "Odesskaya Druzhina" refused to condone this plan. The Ukrainian Security Service eventually arrested Rayevsky for trying to incite ethnic unrest and deported him to Russia. From Saint Petersburg, he called for open rebellion against the pro-Euromaidan Ukrainian government. Despite Rayevsky's removal, the violence in Odesa continued to escalate. Another Russian citizen, Alexei "Foma" Fominov, had also risen to prominence in the local anti-Maidan movement. He later claimed that he had served as "commandant of Kulikovo Field", referencing the tent camp outside the city where pro-Russian forces gathered. On 2 May, riots in Odesa resulted in the deadly Trade Unions House fire; many Russian nationalists such as Fominov subsequently left the city. 

A number of these pro-Russian nationalists from Odesa ultimately relocated to Luhansk where Fominov reorganized them into a proper militia. The unit became known for including a large number of volunteers from Russia. Many of these had previously belonged to the "Yakut" militia. The Odessa Brigade fought at Peremozhnoye and Luhansk International Airport. Ukrainian officials also claimed that the group was responsible for a number of bombings in Odesa from 2014 to 2015. Though the unit fought for the separatist Luhansk People's Republic, it did not fully integrate itself into the Luhansk People's Republic Armed Forces. In January 2015, the Odessa Brigade was dissolved by the LPR. Troops of the Ministry of Internal Affairs of the LPR surrounded the militia's base, disarmed its fighters, and requested that the militants instead sign up for other units in the LPR Armed Forces. Though a large number of native Odessa Brigade members accepted this offer, most of the foreign volunteers refused and opted to return to Russia. Fominov was arrested on charges of criminal activity by LPR officials, though Ukrainian officials believed that his imprisonment and the Odesa Brigade's dissolution were more likely the result of power struggles within the LPR.

Second unit 
The formation of a new "Odessa Brigade" was announced on social media in July 2022, accompanied by claims that Russian forces were still planning to conquer Odesa and Mykolaiv as part of the Southern Ukraine campaign. This unit was led by Igor Markov, an Odesa native and the former leader of a local pro-Russian party. The Frontier Post characterized the foundation of the new Odessa Brigade alongside other declarations at the time as an attempt by Russian propaganda to distract the public from successful Ukrainian counter-attacks in the region.

Leadership and ideology 
Anton Rayevsky, founder of the original anti-Maidan group called "Odessa Brigade", was a Russian ultranationalist and Neo-Nazi. He called for the annexation of Ukrainian territory by Russia. After leaving Odesa, Rayevsky joined other separatist groups before attempting to become a politician in Russia. The unit's second commander, Alexei "Foma" Fominov, generally posed as Russian nationalist and blamed Ukraine for the warfare in the region.

The leader of the reactivated Odessa Brigade, Igor Markov, has made statements conforming with the Russian narrative claim that Ukraine is governed by a Nazi regime.

War crimes 
These civilians were either known for pro-Ukrainian views or relatively wealthy.

References

Military units and formations established in 2014
Military units and formations disestablished in 2015
Military units and formations established in 2022
Pro-Russian militant groups
Separatist forces of the war in Donbas
2014 establishments in Ukraine
2015 disestablishments in Ukraine
2022 establishments in Ukraine
Paramilitary organizations based in Ukraine
Military of the Luhansk People's Republic